Kakrala was a historical region in southern Sindh, in the coastal parts of the Indus Delta. Descriptions of its precise extent vary, but it lay in the middle part of the delta, comprising the present-day taluqas of Shahbandar and Jati in Sujawal and Thatta districts. It has been described as the region from Jati to Kharo Chan, or the region between the mouths of the Wanyani and Pitti rivers. This area later formed part of the pargana of Ghorabari.

From about 1470 to 1760, Kakrala was also a small state, whose rulers took the title of Jam and are called as either Sammas or Kehars (or Kīhars). Their capital was at Dera, which is now in ruins near the site of Chach Jahan Khan. The Jams of Kakrala built numerous tombs and chhatris for themselves and for their patron saints. One of their patron saints was Aban Shah, a 16th-century Suhrawardi mystic who is buried at a place called Aban Shah Ja Takkar (where he had come to live during his lifetime), 2 km south of Chuhar Jamali in Sujawal district. Another was Rajan Shah, also a Suhrawardi mystic from the same family, whose tomb is located 1 km west of Aban Shah's. Both the men and women took part in the tomb-building process; for example, one woman of the Kakrala ruling family commissioned the tombs at Abro Halani near Jati. Kakrala was finally annexed by the Kalhoro dynasty in 1760.

Some 19th-century authors identified Kakrala with the island of Krokala in ancient Greek sources, but this is unlikely because Krokala was probably not in or near the Indus Delta.

Name
The name "Kakrala" is variously transliterated; variant spellings include Kakrāla, Kakrālā, Kakrālah, Kakrālo, and Kukrāla. It is probably derived from the Sindhi adjective kakrālo, meaning "pebbly", derived from the noun kakro meaning "pebble". The interpretation "land's end" has also been proposed, but this is more esoteric.

History
The Tarikh-i-Masumi and/or Tuhfat-ul-Kiram first allude to Kakrala sometime between 1566 and 1568; it calls Kakrala "by the seashore" and says its ruler at the time was Jam Desar.

In January 1573 (Ramadan, 980 AH), Amir Shah Qasim was appointed to govern Kakrala, which was in tumult at the time. He restored order and not long after the government was given to one "Jam Wisar".

Later, under Mirza Ghazi Beg (d. 1612), Kakrala was ruled by one Jam Halah, who was Jam Desar's son. He had crossed into Mirza Ghazi Beg's territory and caused trouble including killing and looting. The Mirza set out with an army to punish Jam Halah, whose relative Jam Daud guided the Mirza. This campaign was successful, and Jam Daud became a favourite of Mirza Ghazi Beg. He married Jam Daud's daughter (the Tarkhan rulers had apparently been trying to get a marriage alliance with the Jams but had not been successful until now) and divided Kakrala into three parts, with two being annexed into his own territory and the remaining one ruled by Jam Daud.

Later, during the final years of Jahangir's life, Jam Hala ended up helping Nawab Sharif al-Mulk in preventing Shah Jahan (then just a prince) from unlawfully seizing Thatta. As a result, when Shah Jahan appointed Mir Abu al-Baqa as governor of Thatta in 1629 (1039 AH), Jam Hala was targeted for chastisement.

In 1738 (1151 AH), the Jam of Kakrala joined with Raja Ajmal of Dharajah in an unsuccessful campaign against Muhammad Muradyab Khan (then just the son of Mian Nur Muhammad).

In 1744 (1157 AH), the Kakrala ruler Jam Hothi was defeated and killed by someone named Shekh Shukrullah, who installed Jam Mahar to succeed him.

Shortly after Muhammad Muradyab Khan was installed as ruler of Sindh, he invaded Kakrala and defeated the Jam, who was "removed from Kodariah and confined at Kakrala, his head-quarters". Under the resulting treaty, Muhammad Muradyab Khan annexed the territories of Ochta, Lanjari, Miran, and Kachah; he fortified each of these places and designated Kachah as the "chief centre of stores".

Two years later, Muhammad Muradyab Khan wanted to invade Kakrala again, but the Kalhoro nobles refused to take part because they didn't want to break the treaty, and they ended up forming a conspiracy to dethrone him and replace him with his brother Mian Ghulam Shah.

In 1760, Jam Desar of Kakrala, who had taken advantage of Ghulam Shah's absence from Shahgarh to lead an incursion into Kalhoro territory, was defeated by a group of generals, including one named Muhammad Siddik Wais, who had been dispatched to deal with him. Then in 1761, he was made to leave the fort of Abad and go to Kutch, while his son Hardarji was kept as a hostage by Mian Ghulam Shah.

Kakrala was one of the parganas of Lower Sindh under the Talpur dynasty. It was governed by a "sazāwal-kār", or revenue collector, with several munshis (writers) to assist in its administration.

References

Historical regions
Geography of Sindh
Sujawal District
Thatta District